The Hong Kong Film Directors' Guild (HKFDG) is an entertainment guild founded in 1989 to represent the interests of directors in the Hong Kong film industry. At the Hong Kong Film Awards committee member votes contribute a weight of 25% towards the overall score of in the categories Best Director, Best New Director and Best Visual Effects.

Executive Committee Members

References

External links
 HKFDG Website

Film organizations in China
Entertainment industry unions